Kolm-e Bala (also Romanized as Kolm-e Bālā and Kalam Bala; also known as Kolm-e ‘Olyā, Kulm, and Kuln) is a village in Dustan Rural District, Badreh District, Darreh Shahr County, Ilam Province, Iran. At the 2006 census, its population was 687, in 138 families. The village is populated by Kurds.

References 

Populated places in Darreh Shahr County
Kurdish settlements in Ilam Province